Edging, peaking, or surfing is a sexual technique whereby an orgasm is controlled. It is practiced alone or with a partner and involves the maintenance of a high level of sexual arousal for an extended period without reaching climax.

When practiced by males, direct sexual stimulation without the refractory period after orgasm is observed. When the controlled orgasm is achieved, the physical sensations are greater as compared to conventional orgasm. Orgasm control is referenced as "slow masturbation" in Alex Comfort's The New Joy of Sex (1993) and "extended massive orgasm" in Vera and Steve Bodansky's 2000 book of the same name. It is similar to the Venus Butterfly technique used in the volume The One Hour Orgasm (1988) by Leah and Bob Schwartz. Detailed practices including exercises can be found in several books, such as Mantak Chia's The Multi-Orgasmic Man.

Orgasm control involves either sex partner being in control of the other partner's orgasm, or a person delaying their own orgasm during sexual activity with a partner or by masturbation. Any method of sexual stimulation can be used to experience controlled orgasm.

In partnered sex 
During intercourse or other forms of sexual stimulation with a partner, one person stimulates the other(s) and reduces the level of stimulation when approaching orgasm. Erotic sexual denial occurs when the partner who is in control of the other partner's orgasm prolongs the orgasm to allow for an increased level of sexual tension. 
When a partner eventually provides enough stimulation to achieve an orgasm, it may be stronger than usual due to increased tension and arousal that builds up during the extended stimulation. An example of the use of orgasm control in partnered sex can be seen in BDSM; if the partner whose orgasm is being controlled (sometimes referred to as the submissive partner) is tied up, it may better control the orgasm (the activity is sometimes called tie and tease; if orgasm is denied, it is then known as tease and denial).

In masturbation 

When practicing alone in masturbation, orgasm control can heighten sexual pleasure. Another reason for practicing orgasm control is to extend the amount of time it takes to orgasm. For a woman, the practitioner can enjoy direct sexual stimulation for longer periods of time, as well as increasing frequency and intensity. For a man, the speed of masturbation may vary to navigate right to the edge of ejaculation. With orgasm control, a male can experience a more intense orgasm, as well as a larger volume of semen expelled during his ejaculation. One technique, commonly referred to as 'edging', involves masturbating up until the moment before reaching the plateau phase just before orgasm occurs, and then stopping suddenly before experiencing a climax. Another technique, commonly referred to as 'surfing', involves reaching the plateau phase and slowing down the stimulation to maintain a heightened level of sensation for an extended time. Repeating either of these techniques many times during a single masturbation session may result in a stronger, more intense orgasm.

Orgasm control is more often possible with masturbation. This is because masturbation allows for individual control and has no reliance on a sexual partner to achieve orgasm. Masturbation can be seen as the starting point in the technique of orgasm control. Self-stimulation can help people learn about the limits of their body and the techniques that may help them in controlling their orgasms. Recent research suggests masturbation may decrease the incidence of prostate cancer.

As it has been described by Steve Bodansky and Vera Bodansky in Extended Massive Orgasm: How You Can Give and Receive Intense Sexual Pleasure, masturbation practiced with the aim of orgasm control should be carried on with the purpose of endured sexual gratification and not to relieve tension, as 'simple' masturbation does. In 2009, Masanobu Sato masturbated for 9 hours and 58 minutes at the 9th annual World Masturbate-a-thon.

See also 

 Blue balls (pain)
Chastity belt (BDSM)
 Coitus reservatus
 Erotic sexual denial
 Eroto-comatose lucidity
Forced orgasm
 Tantric sex

References 

Masturbation
Orgasm
Sexual acts